Thandla is a town in Thandla Tehsil in Jhabua District of Madhya Pradesh, India. It belongs to Indore Division. It is located 30 km north of the District headquarters of Jhabua. It is a Tehsil headquarter. Thandla was named after Bhil Sardar Thana.

.

Geography
It has an average elevation of 271 metres (889 feet). Jhabua, Dahod, Rajgarh, Banswara are nearby cities.

Demographics
At the 2001 India census, Thandla had a population of 12,685. Males constituted 52% of the population and females 48%. Thandla had an average literacy rate of 73%, higher than the national average of 59.5%: male literacy was 80%, and female literacy 66%. 14% of the population were under 6 years of age.

Educational Organizations
There are number of educational institutions in Thandla, such as Government College, Thandla, and a Government Boys and Government Girls schools.

Transport 
The nearest airport is indore.

References

Cities and towns in Jhabua district
Jhabua